Unatara atinga is a species of beetle in the family Cerambycidae, the only species in the genus Unatara.

References

Heteropsini